Negative elongation factor C/D is a protein that in humans is encoded by the TH1L gene.

Function 

The NELF complex of proteins interacts with the DSIF protein complex to repress transcriptional elongation by RNA polymerase II. The protein encoded by this gene is an essential part of the NELF complex. Alternative translation initiation site usage results in the formation of two isoforms with different N-termini.

Interactions 

TH1L has been shown to interact with:
 ARAF, 
 Cofactor of BRCA1, and
 RDBP.

References

Further reading